Crispin Duenas (born January 5, 1986) is a Filipino-Canadian recurve archer who represented Canada at the 2008 Summer Olympics in Beijing, the 2012 Summer Olympics in London, the 2016 Summer Olympics in Rio de Janeiro, and the 2020 Summer Olympics in Tokyo.

He is one of Canada's top male archers with a successful international career as both a cadet and junior. He holds degrees in physics and education from the University of Toronto.

Career

2008 Summer Olympics 
At the 2008 Summer Olympics in Beijing, Duenas finished his ranking round with a total of 664 points. This gave him the 16th seed for the final competition bracket in which he faced Magnus Petersson in the first round. Both scored 108 points in the regular match, and they had to go to an extra round. In this extra round, Duenas scored 18 points, while Petersson advanced to the second round with 19 points.

Together with John David Burnes and Jason Lyon, he also took part in the team event. With his 664 score from the ranking round combined with the 644 of Burns and the 646 of Lyon, the Canadians were in 11th position after the ranking round. In the first round, they were beaten by the Italian team 219-217. Italy would go on to reach the final and win the silver medal.

2012 Summer Olympics 
At the 2012 Summer Olympics, Duenas only competed in the men's individual event. In the ranking round, he shot 678 to seed him 8th in the competition. However, Duenas lost to Ahmed El-Nemr in the first knockout round.

2016 Summer Olympics 
Duenas competed in the men's individual event at the 2016 Summer Olympics in Rio de Janeiro, shooting a 669 in the ranking round to seed him 18th overall. In the first round he defeated Marco Galiazzo of Italy, but lost in the second round to Zach Garrett of the United States.

Accomplishments

2007
 Breaking and re-breaking national records in the FITA round
 Placing 17th individually at the world championship
 Anchoring the Canadian men's team to an 8th-place finish and qualifying the team for the Beijing Olympics
 Placed 6th in the El Salvador World Cup

2008
 2nd in the 2008 Canadian Olympic trials
 3rd Arizona Cup World Ranking event
 2nd in the Ontario Spring Classic
 Member of the Canadian men's team to an 8th-place finish in Dominican Republic World Cup

2009
 1st in the Ontario Spring Classic

2013
 3rd in 2013 World Archery Championships (Men's Individual Recurve)

2014
 1st in Recurve at Lancaster Archery Supply Classic (Unofficial)

References

External links
 
 
 Crispin Duenas  at the Federation of Canadian Archers
 Crispin Duenas at GTA Athletes

Interviews
 A is for Archery 
 CBC Radio June 15, 2008
 Archer aims for bull's-eye University of Toronto News@UofT July 22, 2008

1986 births
Living people
Archers at the 2007 Pan American Games
Archers at the 2011 Pan American Games
Archers at the 2015 Pan American Games
Archers at the 2019 Pan American Games
Archers at the 2008 Summer Olympics
Archers at the 2012 Summer Olympics
Archers at the 2016 Summer Olympics
Canadian male archers
Olympic archers of Canada
Sportspeople from North York
Canadian sportspeople of Filipino descent
World Archery Championships medalists
Pan American Games gold medalists for Canada
Pan American Games silver medalists for Canada
Pan American Games medalists in archery
Medalists at the 2019 Pan American Games
Medalists at the 2011 Pan American Games
Archers at the 2020 Summer Olympics